Dame Ethel Mary Smyth  (22 April 18588 May 1944) was an English composer and a member of the women's suffrage movement. Her compositions include songs, works for piano, chamber music, orchestral works, choral works and operas.

Smyth tended to be marginalised as a ‘woman composer’, as though her work could not be accepted as mainstream. Yet when she produced more delicate compositions, they were criticised for not measuring up to the standard of her male competitors. Nevertheless, she was granted a damehood, the first female composer to be so honoured.

Family background
Ethel Smyth was the fourth of eight children. The youngest was Robert ("Bob") Napier Smyth (1868–1947), who rose to become a Brigadier in the British Army. She was the aunt of Lieutenant General Sir Ralph Eastwood.

She was born in Sidcup, Kent, which is now in the London Borough of Bexley. While 22 April is the actual day of her birth, Smyth habitually stated it was 23 April, the day that was celebrated by her family, as they enjoyed the coincidence with William Shakespeare's.  Her father, John Hall Smyth, who was a major general in the Royal Artillery, was very much opposed to her making a career in music. She lived at Frimhurst, near Frimley Green for many years, before moving to Hook Heath on the outskirts of Woking.

Musical career

She first studied  with Alexander Ewing when she was seventeen. He introduced her to the music of Wagner and Berlioz. After a major battle with her father about her plans to devote her life to music, Smyth was allowed to advance her musical education at the Leipzig Conservatory, where she studied composition with Carl Reinecke. She left after a year, however, disillusioned with the low standard of teaching, and continued her music studies privately with Heinrich von Herzogenberg. While she was at the Leipzig Conservatory, she met Dvořák, Grieg and Tchaikovsky. Through Herzogenberg, she also met Clara Schumann and Brahms. Upon her return to England, she formed a supportive friendship with Arthur Sullivan in the last years of his life; he respected her and encouraged her work.

Smyth's extensive body of work includes the Concerto for Violin, Horn and Orchestra and the Mass in D. Her opera The Wreckers is considered by some critics to be the "most important English opera composed during the period between Purcell and Britten." In 2022 it was performed at the Glyndebourne Festival Opera, the first professional production in its original French libretto. It was also performed at the BBC Proms, where its prelude or overture was included 27 times between 1913 and 1947.

Another of her operas, Der Wald, mounted in 1903, was, for more than a century, the only opera by a woman composer ever produced at New York's Metropolitan Opera (until Kaija Saariaho's L'Amour de loin in December 2016).

On 28 May 1928, the nascent BBC broadcast two concerts of Smyth's music, marking her "musical jubilee", The first comprised chamber music, the second, conducted by Smyth herself, choral works. Otherwise, recognition in England came somewhat late for Ethel Smyth, wrote the conductor Leon Botstein at the time he conducted the American Symphony Orchestra's US premiere of The Wreckers in New York on 30 September 2007:

Her final major work was the hour long vocal symphony The Prison, setting a text by Henry Bennett Brewster. It was first performed in 1931. The first recording was issued by Chandos in 2020. However, she found a new interest in literature and, between 1919 and 1940, she published ten highly successful, mostly autobiographical, books.

Critical reception 
Overall, critical reaction to her work was mixed. She was alternately praised and panned for writing music that was considered too masculine for a "lady composer", as critics called her. Eugene Gates writes that
Smyth's music was seldom evaluated as simply the work of a composer among composers, but as that of a "woman composer". This worked to keep her on the margins of the profession, and, coupled with the double standard of sexual aesthetics, also placed her in a double bind. On the one hand, when she composed powerful, rhythmically vital music, it was said that her work lacked feminine charm; on the other, when she produced delicate, melodious compositions, she was accused of not measuring up to the artistic standards of her male colleagues. 
Other critics were more favourable: "The composer is a learned musician: it is learning which gives her the power to express her natural inborn sense of humour... Dr. Smyth knows her Mozart and her Sullivan: she has learned how to write conversations in music... [The Boatswain's Mate] is one of the merriest, most tuneful, and most delightful comic operas ever put on the stage."

Involvement with the suffrage movement

In 1910, Smyth joined the Women's Social and Political Union (WSPU), which agitated for women's suffrage, giving up music for two years to devote herself to the cause. She accompanied the charismatic leader of the WSPU, Emmeline Pankhurst, on many occasions,  and her "The March of the Women" (1911) became the anthem of the suffragette movement.

Smyth is credited with teaching Emmeline Pankhurst how to throw stones in 1912. After further practice aiming stones at trees near the home of fellow suffragette, Zelie Emerson, Pankhurst called on WPSU members to break a window of the house of any politician who opposed votes for women. Smyth was one of the 109 members who responded to Pankhurst's call, asking to be sent to attack the home of Colonial Secretary Lewis Harcourt, who had remarked that if his wife's beauty and wisdom was present in all women, they would have already won the vote.

Smyth stood half the bail for Helen Craggs, who had been caught on the way to carry out the arson of the leading politician's home.  During the stone throwing, Pankhurst and 100 other women were arrested, and Smyth served two months in Holloway Prison. When Thomas Beecham, her proponent-friend, went to visit her there, he found suffragettes marching in the quadrangle and singing, as Smyth leaned out of a window conducting the song with a toothbrush.

In her book, Female Pipings in Eden, Smyth said her prison experience was of being "in good company" of united women "old, young, rich, poor, strong, delicate", putting the cause they were imprisoned for before their personal needs. Smyth revealed that the prison was infested with cockroaches, even in the hospital ward. She was released early, due to a medical assessment that she was mentally unstable and hysterical. Smyth gave written evidence in the November trial of Pankhurst and others for inciting violence, stating that she (Smyth) had freely engaged in activism. She continued to correspond with Pankhurst, and heard of her getting lost trying to find the safe house provided for her to avoid re-arrest in Scotland.

Smyth strongly disagreed with the support Emmeline Pankhurst and her daughter Christabel gave to the war effort in 1914, but she did train as a radiographer in Paris. Her fractious friendship with Christabel ended in 1925, and Smyth conducted the Metropolitan Police Band at the unveiling of the statue to Emmeline in London in 1930.

Personal life

Smyth had several passionate affairs in her life, most of them with women.  Her philosopher-friend and the librettist of some of her operas, Henry Bennet Brewster, may have been her only male lover. She wrote to him in 1892: "I wonder why it is so much easier for me to love my own sex more passionately than yours. I can't make it out, for I am a very healthy-minded person." Smyth was at one time in love with the married suffragette Emmeline Pankhurst. At age 71, she fell in love with writer Virginia Woolf – herself having worked in the women's suffrage movement – who, both alarmed and amused, said it was "like being caught by a giant crab", but the two became friends. Smyth's relationship with Violet Gordon-Woodhouse is depicted satirically in Roger Scruton's 2005 opera, Violet.

Smyth was actively involved in sport throughout her life. In her youth, she was a keen horse-rider and tennis player. She was a passionate golfer and a member of the ladies' section of Woking Golf Club, near where she lived. After she died and was cremated, her ashes were, as she had requested, scattered in the woods neighbouring the club by her brother Bob.

In recognition of her work as a composer and writer, Smyth was made a Dame Commander of the Order of the British Empire (DBE) in 1922, becoming the first female composer to be awarded a damehood. Smyth received honorary doctorates in music from the Universities of Durham and Oxford. She died in Woking in 1944 at the age of 86.

She met Willie Wilde, the brother of Oscar Wilde, during a trip to Ireland. They became engaged on the railway journey from Holyhead to Euston, but she broke it off within three weeks.

Representations

Ethel Smyth featured, under the name of Edith Staines, in E. F. Benson's Dodo books (1893–1921), decades before the quaint musical characters of his more famous Mapp and Lucia series. She "gleefully acknowledged" the portrait, according to Prunella Scales.
She was later a model for the fictional Dame Hilda Tablet in the 1950s radio plays of Henry Reed.

She was portrayed by Maureen Pryor in the 1974 BBC television film Shoulder to Shoulder.

Judy Chicago's monumental work of feminist art, The Dinner Party, features a place setting for Ethel Smyth.

Since 2018, the actress and singer, Lucy Stevens, has portrayed Ethel Smyth on stage at various venues in Britain.

In March 2022, in recognition of International Women’s Day, a larger-than-size statue by Christine Charlesworth of Smyth conducting was unveiled in Duke’s Court Plaza, Woking by the Mayor of Woking, Cllr Liam Lyons, with invited guests who included members of Smyth’s family as well as academics and councillors. Charlesworth  described her sculpture as:
“Ethel stands, wearing her usual tweed skirt, enthusiastically conducting passers-by with her over-sized baton, as presented to her at the Royal Albert Hall by Emeline Pankhurst.

“Her jacket is half open, her arms are beating out the time and her eyes are full of concentration as she battles with her hearing loss, which went completely in her 50’s.

“Also detailed in her pocket is a sheaf of paper which could be ideas for a new opera, or maybe notes for a new book, as well as sketches and polemical essays.”

Works

Writings

Impressions That Remained: Memoirs (1919) Vol. 1 · Vol. 2
Streaks Of Life (1921)
 (1927)
 (1928)
Female Pipings in Eden (1933)

Beecham and Pharaoh (1935)
 (1936)
 (1936)
Maurice Baring (1938), a memoir of Maurice Baring
What Happened Next (1940)

The Memoirs of Ethel Smyth (1987), abridged and edited by Ronald Crichton. Available on 14-day loan at Archive.org (free registration required)

Recordings
 The Boatswain's Mate. Nadine Benjamin, Rebecca Louise Dale, Edward Lee, Ted Schmitz, Jeremy Huw Williams, Simon Wilding, Mark Nathan, Lontano Ensemble, c. Odaline de la Martinez. Retrospect Opera RO001 (two CDs).
 Cello Sonata in C minor (1880): Friedemann Kupsa cello, Anna Silova piano; Lieder und Balladen, Opp. 3 & 4, Three Moods of the Sea (1913): Maarten Koningsberger baritone, Kelvin Grout piano. TRO-CD 01417.
 Cello Sonata in A minor (1887): Lionel Handy cello, Jennifer Hughes piano: Lyrita SRCD412. (2023)Reviewed at MusicWeb International
 Complete Piano Works. Liana Șerbescu. CPO 999 327-2.
 Concerto for Violin, Horn and Orchestra. BBC Philharmonic, c. Odaline de la Martinez. Chandos Chan 9449.
 Double Concerto in A for violin, horn and piano (1926): Renate Eggebrecht violin, Franz Draxinger horn, Céline Dutilly piano; Four Songs for mezzo-soprano and chamber ensemble (1907): Melinda Paulsen mezzo, Ethel Smyth ensemble; Three songs for mezzo-soprano and piano (1913): Melinda Paulsen mezzo, Angela Gassenhuber piano. TRO-CD 01405.
 Fete Galante: A Dance Dream Charmian Bedford (soprano), Carolyn Dobbin (mezzo soprano), Mark Milhofer (tenor), Alessandro Fisher (tenor), Felix Kemp (baritone), Simon Wallfisch (baritone), Lontano Ensemble/Odaline de la Martinez. Retrospect Opera RO007.
 Mass in D, March of the Women, Scene from The Boatswain's Mate. Eiddwen Harrhy, The Plymouth Music Series, Philip Brunelle. Virgin Classics VC 7 91188-2.
 The Prison: Sarah Brailey, Dashon Burton, soloists; Experiential Orchestra and Chorus; James Blachly, Conductor. Steven Fox, Chorus Master, Blanton Alspaugh and Soundmirror, producer. Chandos Records (2020).
 Serenade in D major. BBC Philharmonic, c. Odaline de la Martinez. Chandos Chan 9449.
 String Quartet in C minor. Maier Quartet. DB Productions, DBCD197.
 String Quartet in E minor and String Quintet op. 1 in E Major. Mannheimer Streichquartett and Joachim Griesheimer. CPO 999 352-2.
 Suite for String Orchestra (1920), Südwestdeutsches Kammerorchester Pforzheim, conducted by Douglas Bostock. CPO 555 457-2 (2022). 
 Violin Sonata in A minor, Op. 7, Cello Sonata in A minor, Op. 5, String Quintet in E major, Op. 1, String Quartet in E minor (1912): Renate Eggebrecht, violin, Friedemann Kupsa cello, Céline Dutilly piano, Fanny Mendelssohn Quartet. TRO-CD 01403 (two CDs).
 Violin Sonata in A minor, Op. 7: Annette-Barbara Vogel, violin, Durval Cesetti, piano. Toccata TOCN0013 (2021).
 The Wreckers. Anne-Marie Owens, Justin Lavender, Peter Sidhom, David Wilson-Johnson, Judith Howarth, Anthony Roden, Brian Bannatyne-Scott, Annemarie Sand. Huddersfield Choral Society, BBC Philharmonic, c. Odaline de la Martinez. Conifer Classics. (Re-released by Retrospect Opera, RO004).

See also
Norah Smyth – Ethel Smyth's niece and also a notable suffragette
List of suffragists and suffragettes
List of Bloomsbury Group people

References
Notes

Cited sources

Benson, E.F. (1986), Dodo: An Omnibus. London: Hogarth Press, 1986  
 Collis, Louise. Impetuous Heart: The Story of Ethel Smyth. London: William Kimber, 1984. 

Gates, Eugene (2006), "Damned If You Do and Damned If You Don't: Sexual Aesthetics and the Music of Dame Ethel Smyth", Kapralova Society Journal 4, no. 1, 2006: 1–5.
Gates, Eugene (2013), "Dame Ethel Smyth: Pioneer of English Opera." Kapralova Society Journal 11, no. 1 (2013): 1–9.
Jebens, Dieter and R. Cansdale (2004), Guide to the Basingstoke Canal. Basingstoke Canal Authority and the Surrey and Hampshire Canal Society, 2004. (2nd Edition)
 St. John, Christopher (1959), Ethel Smyth: A Biography. London: Longmans, Green & Co., 1959.

Further reading
 Anderson, Gwen, Ethel Smyth, London: Cecil Woolf, 1997.   
 Bartsch, Cornelia, Rebecca Grotjahn, and Melanie Unseld. Felsensprengerin, Brückenbauerin, Wegbereiterin: Die Komponistin Ethel Smyth. Rock Blaster, Bridge Builder, Road Paver: The Composer Ethel Smyth.  Allitera, 2010. 
 Broad, Leah. Quartet: How Four Women Changed the Musical World. Faber and Faber, 2023. ISBN 9780571366101
 Crichton, Ronald. The Memoirs of Ethel Smyth. London: Viking Press, 1987.   
 Kertesz, Elizabeth Jane,  Issues in the critical reception of Ethel Smyth’s Mass and first four operas in England and Germany, PhD Dissertation, Melbourne: University of Melbourne on unimelb.edu.au
 Rieger, Eva (editor). A Stormy Winter: Memories of a Pugnacious English Composer. (Autobiography of Ethel Smyth) (Published in German as Ein stürmischer Winter. Erinnerungen einer streitbaren englischen Komponistin.) Kassel: Bärenreiter-Verlag, 1988.
 Stone, Caroline E.M. Another Side of Ethel Smyth: Letters to her Great-Niece, Elizabeth Mary Williamson. Kennedy & Boyd, 2018.

External links

 

 LiederNet Archive
 Dame Ethel Smyth: Pioneer of English Opera – by Eugene Gates, Kapralova Society Journal.
 Ethel Smyth – by Valarie Morris, Sandscape Publications.
 Ethel Mary Smyth letter from the Special Collections and University Archives Department at the University of North Carolina at Greensboro
 Ethel Mary Smyth letter 2 from the Special Collections and University Archives Department at the University of North Carolina at Greensboro
 Dame Ethel Mary Smyth (1858–1944), Composer and writer (National Portrait Gallery)
 
 
 Dame Ethel Smyth: Composer, suffragette, sportswoman and resident of Woking
Retrospect Opera

1858 births
1944 deaths
British women classical composers
19th-century classical composers
20th-century classical composers
Composers awarded knighthoods
Dames Commander of the Order of the British Empire
English classical composers
English expatriates in Germany
Feminist musicians
English feminist writers
Lesbian musicians
LGBT classical composers
English LGBT musicians
Musicians from Kent
Musicians from London
English opera composers
People from Sidcup
People from Frimley
English Romantic composers
University of Music and Theatre Leipzig alumni
Women of the Victorian era
Pupils of Salomon Jadassohn
English autobiographers
Women autobiographers
Writers from London
20th-century English women writers
20th-century British non-fiction writers
Pupils of Carl Reinecke
Women opera composers
20th-century English women musicians
20th-century British composers
19th-century British composers
Women's Social and Political Union
20th-century women composers
19th-century women composers
19th-century English LGBT people
20th-century English LGBT people